Antônio Evanil da Silva (born 27 January 1935), known as Coronel, is a Brazilian footballer. He played in eight matches for the Brazil national football team in 1959. He was also part of Brazil's squad for the 1959 South American Championship that took place in Argentina.

References

External links
 
 

1935 births
Living people
Brazilian footballers
Brazil international footballers
Sportspeople from Rio de Janeiro (state)
Association football defenders
CR Vasco da Gama players
Tupi Football Club players
Associação Ferroviária de Esportes players
Nacional Atlético Clube (SP) players
Unión Magdalena footballers
Brazilian expatriate footballers
Expatriate footballers in Colombia